Kenneth Eugene Frease III (born October 18, 1989) is an American professional basketball player for BBC Monthey of the Swiss Basketball League. He played college basketball for Xavier University.

Career
On August 3, 2012, Frease signed with Tigers Tübingen of Germany for the 2012–13 season.

In July 2013, Frease joined the Milwaukee Bucks for the 2013 NBA Summer League. On August 3, 2013, he signed with Artland Dragons of Germany for the 2013–14 season.

In July 2014, Frease re-joined the Bucks for the 2014 NBA Summer League. On August 30, 2014, he signed with Yeşilgiresun Belediye of the Turkish TBL2. In January 2015, he left Yeşilgiresun and signed with his former team Artland Dragons for the rest of the season.

On June 25, 2015, Frease signed with Basketball Löwen Braunschweig of Germany for the 2015–16 season.

On August 28, 2016, Frease signed with Science City Jena of Germany for the 2016–17 season. He played for SA Massagno Basket in 2018 and averaged 12.8 points, 3.3 assists and 5.5 rebounds per game. On August 4, 2018, Frease signed with the Swiss team BBC Monthey.

References

External links
FIBA bio
Xavier Musketeers bio

1989 births
Living people
American expatriate basketball people in Switzerland
American expatriate basketball people in Germany
American expatriate basketball people in Turkey
American men's basketball players
Artland Dragons players
Basketball Löwen Braunschweig players
Basketball players from Ohio
Centers (basketball)
Sportspeople from Massillon, Ohio
Science City Jena players
Tigers Tübingen players
Xavier Musketeers men's basketball players
Yeşilgiresun Belediye players